Seton Tuning Ltd. (pronounced Seat-on) is a Colchester based motorcycle and race preparation company. Seton Tuning has a partnership with Linxcel Europe Limited named Linxcel-Seton Tuning Motorcycle Race Team which is currently running in The British Supersport 600 Championship.

History
Phil Seton, Is a team owner and the director of Seton Tuning. He won the MRO Supersport 600 Championship in 2006 and is responsible for the machines that won the same championship in 2007 and 2008.

In 2015 Dean Ellison raced for Seton Tuning and won the No Limits Endurance Championship and the overall win at Donington.

Seton tuning riders
Phil Seton (2006-2020)
Hudson Kennaugh (2009)
James Webb (2009)
Danny Buchan (2013)
Dean Ellison (2015)
Bob Collins (2016-2017)
Patrick Sheridan (2017)
Bram Lambrechts (2019)

See also
British Supersport Championship
Motorcycle racing
Motorcycle Racing Deaths in British Series

References

External links
Yamaha YZF-R6

Motorcycle racing
Racing
Motorcycle racing teams
Motorcycle racing teams established in 2006
2006 establishments in the United Kingdom